Xu Huanshan (born 13 July 1937) is a Chinese actor and occasional film director. Xu was enrolled in the Beijing Film Academy in 1956. A year later, he was labelled as a "rightist" and was sent for "re-education through labour" under the Communist government's Anti-Rightist Movement. In 1966, he was sent to Xinjiang to perform hard labour. He returned to Beijing in 1979 and started his acting career. In 1980, he joined the Xi'an Film Production Company (西安电影制片厂) as an actor, and six years later he became a film director. He is best known for playing supporting roles in many television series.

Filmography

Film

Television

External links
 

1937 births
Living people
Male actors from Beijing
Beijing Film Academy alumni
Chinese male film actors
Chinese male television actors